The 2018–19 Tennessee Lady Volunteers basketball team represented the University of Tennessee in the 2018–19 college basketball season. The Lady Vols, led by seventh-year head coach Holly Warlick, played their games at Thompson–Boling Arena and are members of the Southeastern Conference.

The Lady Vols finished the season 19–13, 7–9 for a seventh-place tie in SEC play. They lost in the quarterfinals of the SEC tournament to Mississippi State. They received an at-large bid to the NCAA tournament where they lost to UCLA in the first round. At the completion of the season, Warlick was fired as head coach. Missouri State's Kellie Harper, who was a point guard during Tennessee's 3-peat from 1996 to 1998, was hired as her replacement on April 8.

Roster

Rankings

^Coaches' Poll did not release a second poll at the same time as the AP.

Schedule and results

|-
!colspan=9 style=""| Exhibition

|-
!colspan=9 style=| Regular season

|-
!colspan=9 style=""| SEC Women's Tournament

|-
!colspan=9 style=""|NCAA Women's Tournament

See also
 2018–19 Tennessee Volunteers basketball team

References

Tennessee
Tennessee Lady Volunteers basketball seasons
Volunteers
Volunteers
Tennessee